Nirvana was an American rock band formed by singer/guitarist Kurt Cobain and bassist Krist Novoselic in Aberdeen, Washington. The band went through a succession of drummers and eventually settled on Dave Grohl, who joined the band in 1990. They have released three studio albums: Bleach (1989), Nevermind (1991), and In Utero (1993). The first album was released on the Sub Pop record label, while the remaining albums were released by DGC Records.

The band received several awards and nominations in their debut year in 1992, including nominations for Favorite New Heavy Metal/Hard Rock Artist from the American Music Awards, Best Alternative Music Performance for Nevermind from the Grammy Awards, and Video of the Year and Viewer's Choice for "Smells Like Teen Spirit" from the MTV Video Music Awards. They received the Best Alternative Video award for "Smells Like Teen Spirit" and Best New Artist from the MTV Video Music Awards in the same year. The song "Smells Like Teen Spirit" was also nominated for Best Rock Song at the 1993 Grammy Awards, but it lost to "Layla" by Eric Clapton. Clapton's win over Nirvana would later be named one of the "10 biggest upsets" in Grammy history by Entertainment Weekly. After receiving five nominations from the Grammy Awards without winning any of them, the band finally received the Best Alternative Music Performance award for MTV Unplugged In New York in 1996. Overall, Nirvana has received twelve awards from twenty-five nominations.

American Music Awards
The American Music Awards is an annual awards ceremony created by Dick Clark in 1973. Nirvana has received one award from two nominations.

|-
|  || Nirvana || Favorite New Heavy Metal/Hard Rock Artist || 
|-
|  || Nirvana|| Favorite Heavy Metal/Hard Rock Artist ||

BMI Pop Awards

!Ref.
|-
| 1996
| "About a Girl"
| Award-Winning Song
| 
|

Billboard Music Awards
The Billboard Music Awards honor artists for commercial performance in the U.S., based on record charts published by Billboard. The awards are based on sales data by Nielsen SoundScan and radio information by Nielsen Broadcast Data Systems. The award ceremony was held from 1990 to 2007, until its reintroduction in 2011. 

|-
| 1994
| Nirvana
| Top Billboard 200 Artist - Duo/Group
|

Brit Awards
The Brit Awards are the British Phonographic Industry's annual pop music awards. Nirvana has won one award from three nominations.

|-
| rowspan="2" | 1993 || rowspan="3" | Nirvana || International Breakthrough Act || 
|-
| rowspan="2" | International Group || 
|-
| 1994 ||

GAFFA Awards

Denmark GAFFA Awards
Delivered since 1991, the GAFFA Awards are a Danish award that rewards popular music by the magazine of the same name.

!
|-
| 2006
| Unplugged in New York
| rowspan="2"| Best Foreign Music-DVD
| 
| style="text-align:center;" rowspan="2"|
|-
| 2009
| Live at Reading
| 
|-
|}

Grammy Awards
The Grammy Awards are awarded annually by the National Academy of Recording Arts and Sciences of the United States. Nirvana has received 1 award from a total of seven nominations.

|-
|  || Nevermind || Best Alternative Music Performance || 
|-
|rowspan="2"|  ||rowspan="2"| "Smells Like Teen Spirit" || Best Hard Rock Performance ||  
|-
| Best Rock Song || 
|-
|  || In Utero || Best Alternative Music Performance || 
|-
|rowspan="2"|  ||rowspan="2"| "All Apologies" || Best Rock Performance by a Duo or Group with Vocal || 
|-
| Best Rock Song || 
|-
|  || MTV Unplugged in New York || Best Alternative Music Performance || 
|-
|  ||  || Grammy Lifetime Achievement Award || 
|

Juno Awards

The Juno Awards are presented annually to Canadian musical artists and bands to acknowledge their artistic and technical achievements in all aspects of music. New members of the Canadian Music Hall of Fame are also inducted as part of the awards ceremonies.

|-
| 1993
| Nevermind
| Best Selling Album (Foreign or Domestic)
|

MOJO Awards

MOJO Awards are awarded by the popular British music magazine, Mojo, published monthly by Bauer.

|-
| 2007
| Live! Tonight! Sold Out!!
| Vision Award 
|

MTV Video Music Awards
The MTV Video Music Awards is an annual awards ceremony established in 1984 by MTV. Nirvana has received five awards from ten nominations.

|-
|rowspan="4"|  ||rowspan="4"| "Smells Like Teen Spirit" || Video of the Year || 
|-
| Best New Artist in a Video || 
|-
| Best Alternative Video || 
|-
| Viewer's Choice || 
|-
|  || "In Bloom" || Best Alternative Video || 
|-
|rowspan="5"|  ||rowspan="5"| "Heart-Shaped Box" || Video of the Year || 
|-
| Best Alternative Video || 
|-
| Best Art Direction in a Video || 
|-
| Best Cinematography in a Video || 
|-
| Viewer's Choice ||

NME Awards
Founded by the British music magazine NME, the NME Awards are awarded annually. Nirvana has won four awards from nine nominations.

 
|-
| 1991
| "Smells Like Teen Spirit" 
| Best Single 
|  
|-
| 1995
| Kurt Cobain's Suicide 
| Bummer of the Year 
|  
|-
| 2000
| "Smells Like Teen Spirit" 
| Best Single Ever 
|  
|-
| 2003
| "You Know You're Right"
| Best Video
|  
|-
| 2005
| With The Lights Out
| rowspan="3" | Best Music DVD
| 
|-
| 2008
| Unplugged in New York
|  
|-
| 2010
| Live at Reading
| 
|-
| 2012
| Nevermind
| rowspan="2" | Best Reissue
|  
|-
| 2014
| In Utero
|

O Music Awards

The O Music Awards  is an awards show presented by Viacom to honor music, technology and intersection between the two. The 1st O Music Awards ceremony was held on April 28, 2011 on Fremont Street in Downtown Las Vegas.

|-
| 2011
| "Smells Like Teen Spirit"
| Best Vintage Viral Video
|

Pollstar Concert Industry Awards
The Pollstar Concert Industry Awards aim to reward the best in the business of shows and concerts. 

|-
| rowspan=2|1992
| Themselves 
| Best New Rock Artist 
| 
|-
| Nevermind Tour
| Club Tour of the Year 
|

References

External links
 Nirvana official website

Awards
Lists of awards received by American musician
Lists of awards received by musical group